The Sukreswar (Pron: ˌʃʊˈkreɪʃwə) Temple is an important Shiva temple in the state of Assam in India. The temple is located on the Sukreswar or Itakhuli hill on the south bank of river Brahmaputra in the Panbazar locality of Guwahati city. Leading down from the temple compound is a long flight of steps to the river. Sitting on the steps of Sukreswar ghat one can enjoy the scenery of sun setting on the river, boats moving across the river, people performing puja in honour of their relatives who have left this world, children and older people bathing. It has one of the largest Lingam of Lord Shiva.

History
It is believed to be constructed in 1744 by Ahom King Pramatta Singha (1744–1751). King Rajeswar Singha (1751–69) who also promoted cause of the Saiva cult made financial provisions for the Sukreswar Temple in 1759.

Notes

References 

 Baruah, S.L., Last Days of Ahom Monarchy—A History of Assam from 1769 to 1826, 1993
 Barpujari, H.K., The Comprehensive History of Assam, p. 220, Volume Three, From Thirteenth Century A.D. to the Treaty of Yandabo (1826); Publication Board Assam, Guwahati-781 021.
 
 

Hindu temples in Guwahati
Shiva temples in Assam
1744 establishments in Asia